is a Japanese former professional boxer who competed from 1974 to 1981. He held the WBA light-flyweight title from 1976 to 1981, making a total of 13 successful defences. Following his retirement from boxing, he remains popular in Japan as a tarento having signed a contract with Ohta Production. He is well known in Japan for his comical trademark looks of perm afro hair style.

Gushiken was inducted in 2015 to the International Boxing Hall of Fame.

Biography
Gushiken was known for having strong stamina, allowing him to pressure opponents into mistakes after many rounds. His southpaw stance allowed him to take advantage of many mistakes, usually by throwing unexpected combinations of punches instead of waiting for counterpunch opportunities.

His popularity centered in mainland Japan, where he was known by the nickname Kanmuriwashi (Fierce Eagle) and crowds were normally sold out. He quickly rose through the amateur ranks and won All-Japan in high school.

WBA light-flyweight champion
After that, he went pro and fought for the WBA light-flyweight title after just nine professional fights. He defeated Juan Antonio Guzmán, a well-seasoned pro, by knockout in the seventh round. He held the title for over four years, making thirteen defenses and winning eight by knockout.

Jaime Rios nearly defeated Gushiken in 1977 and 1978, but lost after wilting in the last rounds of the match. Other victories of note were against Panama's future world champions Alfonso Lopez and Rafael Pedroza. As with Rios, they lost after many rounds of being worn down by Gushiken.

In his thirteenth title defense, he fought Pedro Flores, winning by a close margin. In the rematch, Flores was better at reserving his energy and defeated Gushiken by knockout in the twelfth round. Many expected Gushiken to return to the ring, but he announced his retirement five months after his loss.

Tarento
Despite retiring from boxing in 1981, he remains a popular figure in Japan. As a tarento he has appeared on countless variety and quiz shows, including "Cream Quiz! Miracle 9" where he is a regular.

Professional boxing record

See also
List of light flyweight boxing champions
List of WBA world champions
List of Japanese boxing world champions
The Gushiken Family of Okinawa
Boxing in Japan

References

External links
 
 Shirai-Gushiken sports gym official (Japanese)
 The memorial hall of Yoko Gushiken

1955 births
Living people
Light-flyweight boxers
World boxing champions
World light-flyweight boxing champions
World Boxing Association champions
Boxing commentators
People from Okinawa Prefecture
Japanese male boxers
International Boxing Hall of Fame inductees